Karan Kaur Brar is an Indian politician and member of Indian National Congress. She served as a Member of the Punjab Legislative Assembly from Muktsar(2012-2017). She is the daughter-in-law of former Chief Minister Harcharan Singh Brar.

Personal life 
Karan Kaur Brar was born in 1951. She was married to Adesh Kanwarjit Singh Brar(Sunny Brar). Together the couple has 3 sons. Her father-in-law Harcharan Singh Brar served as the 13th Chief Minister of Punjab. She completed her schooling from The Convent of Jesus and Mary at New Delhi. She is a graduate from St. Bede's College under Himachal University.Her majors were in History and French.

Political career 
Karan Kaur Brar started her political career in 2004. She fought the 2004 Lok Sabha elections from Faridkot against Sukhbir Singh Badal. In 2012, she was elected to the Punjab Legislative Assembly. She defeated Kanwarjit Singh Rozy Barkandi by 9255 votes. Barely two days before the elections results were announced Karan Brar lost her husband Adesh Kanwarjit Singh Brar(Sunny Brar) to cancer. During her tenure she remained Member of various committees including House Committee, Committee on Privileges, Committee on Public Accounts, Committee on Estimates and Committee on Local Bodies. She was the second richest candidate in the 2022 Punjab Assembly Elections.

References 

Indian politicians
1951 births
Punjab, India politicians
Indian National Congress politicians from Punjab, India
Punjab, India MLAs 2012–2017
Living people